Lebanon (/ˈlɛbnən/) is a city in and the county seat of Boone County, Indiana, United States. The population was 15,792 at the 2010 census.

History
Lebanon was founded in 1832. It was named by a pioneer settler who saw a stand of hickory trees on the site and was reminded of the Biblical cedars of Lebanon. The first post office at Lebanon was established in 1832.

Historical sites
Lebanon is the home of the Historic Cragun House. Built in 1893, it was once the home of Strange Nathaniel Cragun and his family. The family travelled the world, and their house is now a living history museum full of the pieces they collected from their travels as well as original furniture from the dwelling. This Victorian home is owned and maintained by the Boone County Historical Society and serves as headquarters for the organization. The Cragun House has been added to the National Register of Historic Places.

Also listed on the National Register of Historic Places are the Boone County Courthouse and Oak Hill Cemetery (Lebanon, Indiana).

Geography
Lebanon is located at  (40.052137, -86.471570).

Notable architecture 
The county courthouse of Lebanon is notable for its single-piece vertical Ionic order limestone columns. They were at one time believed to be the largest single-piece limestone columns in the world.

Demographics

2010 census
As of the census of 2010, there were 15,792 people, 6,433 households, and 4,049 families living in the city. The racial makeup of the city was 96.1% White, 0.5% African American, 0.2% Native American, 0.6% Asian, 1.1% from other races, and 1.5% from two or more races. Hispanic or Latino of any race were 3.1% of the population.

There were 6,433 households, of which 32.6% had children under the age of 18 living with them, 46.0% were married couples living together, 11.8% had a female householder with no husband present, 5.2% had a male householder with no wife present, and 37.1% were non-families. 30.9% of all households were made up of individuals, and 11.8% had someone living alone who was 65 years of age or older. The average household size was 2.38 and the average family size was 2.97.

The median age in the city was 37.5 years. 24.5% of residents were under the age of 18; 8.5% were between the ages of 18 and 24; 26.8% were from 25 to 44; 25.6% were from 45 to 64; and 14.7% were 65 years of age or older. The gender makeup of the city was 48.0% male and 52.0% female.

2000 census
As of the census of 2000, there were 14,222 people, 5,834 households, and 3,780 families living in the city. The racial makeup of the city was 97.67% White, 0.33% African American, 0.39% Native American, 0.37% Asian, 0.58% from other races, and 0.65% from two or more races. Hispanic or Latino of any race were 1.61% of the population.

There were 5,834 households, out of which 32.7% had children under the age of 18 living with them, 50.5% were married couples living together, 10.9% had a female householder with no husband present, and 35.2% were non-families. 29.9% of all households were made up of individuals, and 11.8% had someone living alone who was 65 years of age or older. The average household size was 2.40 and the average family size was 2.99.

In the city, the population was spread out, with 26.7% under the age of 18, 9.0% from 18 to 24, 30.8% from 25 to 44, 19.9% from 45 to 64, and 13.7% who were 65 years of age or older. The median age was 34 years. For every 100 females, there were 91.2 males. For every 100 females age 18 and over, there were 85.8 males.

The median income for a household in the city was $37,791, and the median income for a family was $47,769. Males had a median income of $35,614 versus $22,791 for females. The per capita income for the city was $18,245. About 4.4% of families and 7.1% of the population were below the poverty line, including 6.4% of those under age 18 and 10.6% of those age 65 or over.

Government
The government consists of a mayor and a city council. The mayor and clerk-treasurer are elected in a citywide vote. The city council consists of seven members, five of whom are elected from individual districts, while two are elected at-large.

Current elected officials - Lebanon, Indiana
Mayor: Matt Gentry
Clerk-Treasurer: Tonya Thayer
City Council, District 1: Mike Kincaid
City Council, District 2: Keith Campbell
City Council, District 3: Morris Jones
City Council, District 4: Dick Robertson
City Council, District 5: John Copeland
City Council, At Large: Sierra Messenger
City Council, At Large: Brent Wheat

Politics
The most recent mayoral election occurred in November 2015 where Republican Matt Gentry 65.48% defeated Democrat Michele Thomas 33.46% by a 2 to 1 margin. Gentry was highly favored after defeating the incumbent Mayor Huck Lewis by a 2 to 1 margin. At age 26, Gentry became the youngest mayor in Lebanon history.

Tonya Thayer was re-elected as Clerk-Treasurer with no opposition. The only contested city council seats were the two at-large bids, where newcomer Dan Fleming (Republican) 43.42% and incumbent Jeremy Lamar (Republican) 34.86% were able to defeat Aaron Smith (Independent) 21.71%.

The mayoral election of 2011 occurred in May because no Democrats filed for the position. Incumbent Mayor Huck Lewis was able to retain his seat against Debbie Ottinger. Lewis won with 53.39% compared to Ottinger's 46.61%.

Former Mayor Jim Acton (Democratic Party) did not file to run for a fifth term, which left the 2007 election open to new candidates.

In the mayoral election of November 2007. The candidates were: Republican John Lasley, President of the Lebanon City-Council, Democrat Roger Neal, Lebanon Community School Corporation School Board member and former Lebanon Parks and Recreation Director, and independent candidate George Piper who used to be an editor at The Lebanon Reporter, which is Boone County's largest newspaper.

Republican City Council President John Lasley won the election with 48% of the vote, to Democrat Roger Neal's 27% and Independent George Piper's 25%.

30% of registered voters cast votes in the 2007 election.

Lasley died on May 2, 2009. He was battling a recurrence of cancer since December. City Council President Dick Robertson assumed the mayoral duties until the Republican Party precinct chairpersons met to choose Harold "Huck" Lewis as his successor.

Despite having recently elected Democratic mayors, Lebanon can be considered to be highly Republican when it comes to national and state politics. In the 2008 election, Boone County (the county in which Lebanon is located) voted 62% for Republican presidential candidate John McCain and more than 80% for Republican gubernatorial candidate Mitch Daniels.

Education
Lebanon Community School Corporation has six schools under its jurisdiction: four elementary schools, a middle school and a high school. The body enrolled 3,381 students for the 2019–2020 school year, and is recognized as a “B” district by the Indiana Department of Education.

List of schools - Lebanon Community School Corporation
 Lebanon Senior High School
 Lebanon Middle School
 Central Elementary School
 Hattie B. Stokes Elementary School
 Harney Elementary School
 Perry-Worth Elementary School

The city has a lending library, the Lebanon Public Library, which was established as a Carnegie library with an initial grant of $15,000 in 1903.

Economy
Major employers in Lebanon include Lebanon Community School Corporation; the U.S. headquarters of German power tools company Festool and of Canadian specialty foods manufacturer Skjodt-Barrett; manufacturing plants for Hendrickson International, DS Smith, Kuraray, Kauffman Engineering, Maplehurst Bakeries, and D-A Lubricant Company; distribution centers for CNH Parts & Services, Subaru of America, Continental Tire the Americas, and Hachette Book Group USA; and health care and medical facilities operated by Witham Health Services.

Transportation
Highways 
  Interstate 65 to Gary (near Chicago) and Indianapolis
  US 52. A junction of U.S Route 52 and Interstate 65 is located in the northwest part of Lebanon, and the two routes are concurrent through most of the city.
  State Road 32 to Crawfordsville and Muncie
  State Road 39 to LaPorte and Martinsville

Airports
The Boone County Airport is located two nautical miles (2.3 mi, 3.7 km) southeast of Lebanon's central business district.

Railroads and Trails
CSX provides freight rail service in Lebanon. The Lebanon Business Park located in the southwest part of the city is designated a CSX Select Site; CSX constructed a rail spur directly into the business park.

The Lafayette and Indianapolis Railroad line traversing Lebanon was owned and operated by a number of companies from its inception in 1852 until it was abandoned in 1985. Portions of the former railroad line have been re-purposed as a shared use path currently known as Big 4 or Farm Heritage Trail. A trailhead is located at Sam Ralston Road east of Interstate 65 in Lebanon, and the trail extends  from this point northwest to Thorntown.

Notable people
 Doug Jones, MLB All-Star relief pitcher
 Mel Kenyon, Hall of Fame midget car driver; had four top-five finishes in Indianapolis 500; inducted in International Motorsports Hall of Fame
 Sylvia Likens, murder victim, born in Lebanon, murdered in Indianapolis in 1965 when she was 16
 Ray Long, editor of Cosmopolitan from 1919 to 1931, was born in Lebanon
 Ami McKay, novelist, playwright and journalist.
 Rick Mount, 1966 Indiana "Mr. Basketball" award recipient, 3x All-American Purdue player, member of 1972 ABA championship Indiana Pacers team
 William Perigo, basketball head coach at Western Michigan University and University of Michigan
 Drew Powell, actor, is best known for his role as Hoss Cartwright on the PAX series Ponderosa and as Butch Gilzean on FOX's "Gotham", and for his guest roles on Malcolm in the Middle and Leverage
 Allen Saunders, cartoonist and writer, Mary Worth
 G. Thomas Tanselle, textual critic, bibliographer, and book collector, especially known for his work on Herman Melville
 Craig Terrill, former Purdue and Seattle Seahawks football player
 Herman B Wells, former President of Indiana University, attended Lebanon High School and worked as teller at his father's bank in Lebanon for several years

References

External links

 City website 
 History of Lebanon, Indiana

Cities in Indiana
Cities in Boone County, Indiana
County seats in Indiana
Indianapolis metropolitan area